Fazliu is an Albanian surname. Notable people with the name include:

Astrit Fazliu (born 1987), Kosovo Albanian footballer
Bahri Fazliu (1971–1998), Kosovo Albanian poet, publicist and nationalist
Valon Fazliu (born 1996), Swiss footballer

Albanian-language surnames